Robert Jan Verbelen (5 April 1911, Herent, Belgium – 28 October 1990, Vienna, Austria) was a Belgian Nazi collaborator. During the last years of World War II, Verbelen was head of the De Vlag Veiligheidscorps, a Nazi SS security force in Belgium. In that function he ordered the assassination of Alexandre Galopin, director of the Société Générale de Belgique, and tried to murder Albert Devèze, Minister of State, Charles Collard-de Sloovere, Attorney General, and Robert de Foy, former State Security director. He was sentenced to death by a Belgian court in 1947 that had found him responsible for the deaths of 101 Belgian resistance fighters.

After the liberation of Belgium during the Second World War, Verbelen fled through Germany to Austria, where he worked for eight years for the Counter Intelligence Corps of the US Army although he had been convicted as war criminal in Belgium. He obtained Austrian citizenship in 1959. In 1965, Verbelen was charged with five murders by a court in Austrian. However, he was acquitted on all counts.

Sources
 Gerald Steinacher, Nazis auf der Flucht. Wie Kriegsverbrecher über Italien nach Übersee entkamen. Studienverlag Wien-Innsbruck-München 2008

External links
  Robert Jan Verbelen and the United States Government: A Report to the Assistant Attorney General, Criminal Division

1911 births
1990 deaths
Belgian collaborators with Nazi Germany
Belgian people convicted of war crimes
Belgian prisoners sentenced to death
Prisoners sentenced to death by Belgium
Nazis sentenced to death in absentia
Naturalised citizens of Austria